The United States women's national soccer team played their first international soccer match on August 18, 1985, losing to Italy 1–0 at the 1985 Mundialito. Since that first match, 28 U.S. international players have scored a hat-trick (three goals or more in a game). The first player to accomplish the feat was Carin Jennings, who had three goals against Japan on June 1, 1988. Nine players have scored five goals in a game: Michelle Akers, Brandi Chastain, Crystal Dunn, Sydney Leroux, Carli Lloyd, Tiffany Milbrett, Alex Morgan, Amy Rodriguez, and Abby Wambach. Four-goal performances have been achieved by seven players; Wambach and Mia Hamm each did so twice. Multiple American players scored three goals or more in the same match on June 2, 2000, against Canada (Milbrett and Cindy Parlow); September 8, 2002, against Scotland (Hamm and Wambach); January 20, 2012, against the Dominican Republic (Rodriguez and Heather O'Reilly; and December 18, 2014, against Argentina (Lloyd and Christen Press).

The record for the most international hat-tricks by a U.S. women's national team player is 10, by Hamm; she scored three goals in a match eight times, along with her two four-goal games. Lloyd has nine hat-tricks; her ninth came in a 9–0 win against Paraguay on September 17, 2021, which was her five-goal performance. Parlow and Wambach each had eight hat-tricks. Along with one four-goal match, Parlow scored three goals on seven occasions. Wambach had three-goal efforts in five games, in addition to her three matches with four or five goals. Akers follows with seven hat-tricks, while Morgan has six. Milbrett and Press each have four hat-tricks. The most recent U.S. women's national team hat-trick was recorded by Sophia Smith, who had three goals in a 9–1 win against Uzbekistan on April 9, 2022.

U.S. players have scored hat-tricks in the FIFA Women's World Cup four times. Akers' five-goal performance came in the quarterfinals of the 1991 World Cup against Chinese Taipei, in a 7–0 U.S. victory. She set the record for the most goals scored in a Women's World Cup match. In the semifinals of the 1991 tournament, Jennings posted a hat-trick as the U.S. won 5–2 over Germany. At the 2015 World Cup final against Japan, Lloyd scored three goals inside of the first 16 minutes of an eventual 5–2 U.S. win; her performance was punctuated by her final goal, a right-footed strike from the halfway line. Morgan matched Akers' record at the 2019 World Cup with five goals in the first group stage game for the U.S., a 13–0 rout of Thailand.

Three players have recorded hat-tricks against the U.S. national team. At the 2001 Algarve Cup, Ragnhild Gulbrandsen of Norway scored three times in her country's 4–3 win over the American side. Eleven years later, Christine Sinclair of Canada became the second player to score a hat-trick against the U.S., as she tallied three goals in the 2012 Olympic semifinals. Despite Sinclair's efforts, the U.S. defeated Canada 4–3 en route to winning the gold medal. In 2014, Marta accounted for all of Brazil's goals in a 3–2 victory against the U.S. at the International Women's Football Tournament of Brasília.

Hat-tricks for the United States
Key

Table
The result is presented with the United States' score first.

Hat-tricks conceded by the United States
The result is presented with the United States' score first.

Hat-trick of own goals against the United States
The result is presented with the United States' score first.

References

Bibliography

 (Unpaginated version consulted online via Google Books)

United States women's national team
Hat-tricks
United States women's national team
Hat-tricks